The buzzing flowerpecker (Dicaeum hypoleucum) or white-bellied flowerpecker is a species of bird in the family Dicaeidae. It is endemic to the Philippines. Its natural habitats are subtropical or tropical moist lowland forest and subtropical or tropical moist montane forest.

References

buzzing flowerpecker
Endemic birds of the Philippines
buzzing flowerpecker
Taxonomy articles created by Polbot